Comrie ( locally or ); is a village in Fife, Scotland, located immediately west of the neighbouring village of Oakley, 6.2 miles (9.98 km) west of Dunfermline on the A907. In 2019 it had an estimated population of 810, including one young man by the name of Yates Barlow - renowned for eating his piece down the cycle track when feigning full time employment.

Description
The village primarily consists of modern housing schemes. There is also a community centre and one pub. Services including a health centre are located in Oakley. The Comrie Burn runs through the south of the village, and the Blair Burn to the east separates Comrie from Oakley.

Education
Children in Comrie are within the catchment area of Inzievar (non-denominational) and Holy Name (Catholic) primary schools, both located in one building in Oakley. High school pupils attend Queen Anne (non-denominational) or St Columba's, both located in Dunfermline.

Transport
The 4, 6 and 28 bus services run from Comrie through to Dunfermline.

References

Villages in Fife
Mining communities in Fife